Matti Mäkelä (born 14 January 1939) is a Finnish footballer. He played in 29 matches for the Finland national football team from 1961 to 1970.

References

1939 births
Living people
Finnish footballers
Finland international footballers
Place of birth missing (living people)
Association footballers not categorized by position